Ozara may refer to: 

Ozara, Abia State, in Nigeria
Ozara, Enugu State, in Nigeria
Ozara, Imo State, in Nigeria

See also
 Ozar (disambiguation)
Ozora, a village in Tolna County, Hungary